Excelsior Records was an American record label established by Otis René, which existed from 1944 to 1971.  It is particularly notable as having released some of the earliest recordings of Nat King Cole.  It is not to be confused with former MCA and current independent record label Excelsior Recordings of The Netherlands.

History
The Excelsior record label was established by Otis René in 1944, and ceased operations in original form in 1951, only to live on in a second incarnation until 1971.  It is particularly notable for having released some of the first recordings by Nat King Cole.  Otis René was noted to have earned $25,000 on one song in 1945, "I'm Lost", recorded by the King Cole Trio.  René had written and produced the song, as well as distributed the record. Other artists on Excelsior Records included Herb Jeffries, the King Perry Orchestra, Timmie Rogers, the Flennoy Trio, Gerald Wilson & His Orchestra, the Charles Mingus Sextet, Johnny Otis & His Orchestra, the Gladys Bentley Quintet, and the Al Stomp Russell Trio.

Otis René and his brother Leon René (who owned Exclusive Records) had purchased their own shellac record pressing plant, but when the format changed from 78 rpm to 45 rpm, their old equipment could not press the new smaller vinyl discs, and both labels went out of business, only to be purchased out of bankruptcy in name only, and the label existed another 20 years by selling second and third-run pressings of recordings.
In 1952, Otis started up the short-lived Spin Records with musician Preston Love.

List of artists on Excelsior

 Buddy Banks Orchestra
 Eddie Beal Trio
 Gladys Bentley Quintette
 Smiley Burnette & His Rancheros
 King Cole Trio
 Herb Jeffries
 'Memphis' Jimmy McCracklin
 Charles Mingus Sextette
 Johnny Otis and his Orchestra
 King Perry Orchestra
 Timmie Rogers
 Jimmy Rushing
 Lucky Thompson All Stars
 Big Joe Turner
 Gerald Wilson & His Orchestra

CD compilations
 The Otis René Story (1942-1952) V.S.O.P. Records #121 [UPC: 722937212126] 2-CD set - note: features 44 songs from the vaults of Excelsior Records, including 9 previously unreleased tracks and demos; also includes 5 of the 6 tracks released by his short-lived Spin Records label.

References

External links
Excelsior Records on the Internet Archive's Great 78 Project

American record labels